Étranges Libellules S.A. (French for "strange dragonflies") was a French video game developer based in Lyon, France. It was founded in 1994 and closed on 29 June 2012.

Games developed

External links
Official Web site:
Company Web site – archived May 2012; requires Adobe Flash
Company Web site (French) – archived Oct. 2007; does not use Flash
Company Web site (English) – archived Oct. 2007; does not use Flash
Alternative company Web site:
Alt. company Web site – archived Apr. 2012; requires Adobe Flash
Alt. company Web site (French) – archived Sep. 2008; does not use Flash

Defunct video game companies of France
Video game companies established in 1994
Video game companies disestablished in 2012
Video game development companies
French companies disestablished in 2012
French companies established in 1994